The 1988 CONCACAF U-16 Championship was a North American international association football tournament, it determined the 1989 FIFA U-16 World Championship entrants from the CONCACAF region. The 1988 edition of the competition was held in Trinidad and Tobago.

First round

Group A

Group B

Final Group

Canada, Cuba and USA qualified to the 1989 FIFA U-16 World Championship in Scotland.

1988
U-17
1988
1988–89 in Mexican football
1988–89 in Honduran football
1988 in American soccer
1988 in Canadian soccer
football
1988 in youth association football
1988 in Trinidad and Tobago football